Stordalen is a Norwegian surname. Notable people with the surname include:

Gunhild Anker Stordalen (born 1979), Norwegian physician
Herman Stordalen (1895–1961), Norwegian politician
Morten Stordalen (born 1968), Norwegian politician
Petter Stordalen (born 1962), Norwegian businessman

Norwegian-language surnames